Point Florence is a geographic cape extending into Otsego Lake in the Town of Otsego north of Cooperstown, New York.

References

Landforms of Otsego County, New York